Bures  is a village in eastern England that straddles the Essex/Suffolk border, made up of two civil parishes: Bures Hamlet in Essex and Bures St. Mary in Suffolk.

Division
The place is bisected by the River Stour, the county boundary from the end of its estuary to near its source. The village is most often referred to collectively, as Bures. On the respective banks are two civil parishes: Bures Hamlet in the Braintree district of Essex, and Bures St. Mary in the Babergh district of Suffolk. The village is a post town and its pre-1996 (obsolete) postal county was Suffolk.

Landmarks and amenities

On the left bank is the medieval-core church of St Mary the Virgin housing eight bells with the largest weighing 21 cwt. They were augmented from six to eight bells in 1951 by Gillett and Johnston of Croydon.  In terms of the ecclesiastical parish, and thus history before the invention of civil parishes in the 1870s there is no division, save as to county; all falls into Bures St Mary, which extends to a similar distance on each side of the river.

Approximately 1 mile (1.6km) east of the village, on the edge of the Dedham Vale AONB, is a chalk outline of a dragon, which was created as part of the Diamond Jubilee celebrations in 2012. The shape of a dragon relates to a legend from the Middle Ages that tells the story of the knight Sir Richard Waldegrave, whose servants attempted to kill a dragon, but failed due to its tough hide.

A viewpoint of the dragon can be accessed on a public footpath, close to St Stephen's chapel, the oldest building in the parish. The Archbishop of Canterbury dedicated the site to St Stephen on Saint Stephen's Day in 1218.

The village is served by Bures railway station.

Bures United F.C. is a football team with several sides.

References

External links

Bures Parish Church
Bures-online Community Web Site
Bures at War
Bures United FC

Villages in Suffolk
Villages in Essex
Babergh District
Braintree District